RHE may refer to:

 Reversible hydrogen electrode
 Rachel Held Evans

 Remote Hands & Eyes in a datacenter